Mount Olympus is a mountain in the Cradle Mountain-Lake St Clair National Park in Tasmania, Australia.

History
In 1835 George Frankland climbed the mountain and named it Mount Olympus.

Art
 
Mount Olympus was painted by the Australian landscape painter, William Charles Piguenit. It was purchased by the Art Gallery of New South Wales in 1875 and was the Gallery's first oil painting acquisition, "the first Australian work purchased by public subscription", and the first work acquired by the gallery of an Australian-born artist.

Another of Piguenit's Olympus paintings is held by the National Library of Australia.

Flora
Nothofagus gunnii was first collected by Ronald Campbell Gunn in 1847 from Olympus. It is "Australia's only cold climate winter-deciduous tree", is found mainly in areas above 800 metres with rainfall of more than 1800mm, and is one of the plants that indicates Gondwana.

See also
 List of highest mountains of Tasmania
 List of mountains in Australia

References

Olympus
Central Highlands (Tasmania)
Cradle Mountain-Lake St Clair National Park